= Geology of the Collectivity of Saint Martin =

The geology of the Collectivity of Saint Martin consists of andesite tuff and tuff breccia from the middle and late Eocene, intruded by hypabyssal basalt, quartz diorite and younger andesite. Volcanic activity led to metamorphism of many rocks and the tilting and folding of the tuff series. Limestone and marl was later unconformably deposited atop the eroded volcanic rocks as volcanic activity shifted elsewhere. Large boulder ridges and solitary boulders on high cliffs suggest tectonic-related tsunamis.
